Probable G-protein coupled receptor 124 is a protein that in humans is encoded by the GPR124 gene.  It is a member of the adhesion-GPCR family of receptors. Family members are characterized by an extended extracellular region with a variable number of protein domains coupled to a TM7 domain via a domain known as the GPCR-Autoproteolysis INducing (GAIN) domain.

Interactions
GPR124 has been shown to interact with DLG1 and is involved in the Wnt/β-catenin signaling pathway along with RECK.

Zebrafish embryos with Gpr124 loss of function demonstrate severe angiogenic deficiencies in the central nervous system.

References

Further reading

G protein-coupled receptors